The Mainflingen mediumwave transmitter (Mainflingen B) is a mediumwave transmission facility south of the A3 motorway near Mainflingen, Hesse, Germany. Mainflingen was the first mediumwave transmitter for the radio station Deutschlandfunk. It went into service in 1962 with a transmission power of 50 kW, on a frequency of 1538 kHz, at the upper end of the mediumwave band. This frequency has a bad groundwave propagation and therefore a low range at daytime, but an excellent skywave propagation with a long range at night.

In December 1962 the transmission power of Mainflingen was increased to 300 kW. Until 1967 its antenna was on the same site as the Mainflingen longwave transmitters. This resulted in interference problems, which made the desired further increase of transmission power impossible. A new transmitter, with a directional and an omnidirecional antenna, was built in the mid-1960s on a site south of the A3, at a distance great enough from the longwave transmitters that even when using a power of 1000 kW, no greater interference problems would occur. This facility went into service on January 1, 1967.

The directional and the omnidirectional antennas were somewhat unusual for mediumwave broadcasting antennas. The omnidirectional antenna consisted of a ground-fed 142-metre-tall guyed mast, carrying a double conical cage antenna with a diameter of 64 metres. This construction allowed its usage for all mediumwave frequencies, and therefore also as backup antenna for Deutschlandfunk's mediumwave transmitters at other sites. The directional antenna consisted of two horizontal dipoles which were mounted on 4.85-metre-tall guyed masts at a height of 75 metres, with a radiation maximum showing in northeast and southwest direction. As the omnidirectional antenna could not be used for the full available transmission power of 700 kW, in 1974 a 95-metre-tall guyed ground-fed mast radiator was built. A transmission power of 1050 kW was also possible by switching the third backup transmitter in parallel, but for economical reasons was never used. The transmitter was now run during the day with 700 kW and omnidirectional radiation, and at night with 350 kW and directional radiation, and was also used in the evenings for transmitting English-language programmes.

The introduction of the wave plan of Geneva resulted in an increase of the transmission frequency from 1538 kHz to 1539 kHz. Mainflingen's daily operation mode was not affected. However, according to the wave plan, it was no longer allowed to use the double conical antenna as backup antenna for Deutschlandfunk's other mediumwave transmitters. The regulations of the wave plan of Geneva do not normally allow operation of backup transmitters more than 50 kilometres away from the standard site without special coordinative measures. This antenna was therefore dismantled in 1982.

After March 1, 1983 Deutschlandfunk was also broadcast at night using omnidirectional radiation, and the four masts of the directional antenna was dismantled afterwards. From April 1, 1988 the transmission power was reduced to 350 kW. Beside the bad groundwave propagation of the used frequency, broadcasts from the transmitter were only sufficiently well-received during daytime, despite the high power output. This resulted in a shut-down of the transmitter on December 31, 1994, some years after the cancellation of foreign language transmissions.

As a replacement, Saarländischer Rundfunk's Heusweiler transmitter was leased. It was first planned to demolish the Mainflingen facility, but on April 1, 1996 Evangeliums-Rundfunk (ERF), a religious broadcaster, which already hired transmission time at Trans World Radio restarted its operation.

Several disputes between Deutsche Telekom and the Mainhausen municipality occurred, as after the relaunch, problems with electromagnetic influence of electric devices were reported. Local residents were therefore opposed to continued use of the transmitter. In 1998 it was decided that the site could be used for mediumwave transmission and modernization of the facility started. First the old transmitter was replaced by a new, fully transistorized transmitter, which would be also able to operate in DRM mode.

In order to allow a good night-time transmission without causing too many problems with electromagnetic influence, a cross-dipole antenna with a radiation maximum pointing vertically into the sky was built in early 2006. This antenna, which is one of the few applications of circular polarisation for broadcasting, is mounted on 5 guyed masts. The central mast of this antenna is grounded. It carries the feeder cables running to the dipole, while the masts at the edge are standing on insulators and grounded via inductances in such way that they radiate as low a frequency as possible. In this way, undesired parasitic radiations, which are the cause of electromagnetic influence, are suppressed. The radiated wave must be right-hand polarized, otherwise the signal reflected on the ionosphere would be 20 dB less strong. In spring 2006 this new antenna went into service. It is used only for night-time transmissions, as the desired ionospheric reflection occurs only at night. During the day the old mast is used.

See also
 Mainflingen longwave transmitter

References

External links

 
 
 
 Mainflingen Medium Wave Transmitter on skyscraperpage.com
 Mainflingen 1539 kHz (in German)
 Mainflingen Kreuzdipol (published by www.waniewski.de in German)
 Mainflingen cross dipole (published by www.waniewski.de in English)
 Horizontal Task for TRANSRADIO
 Aerial Photo from WikiMapia
 Aerial photo of the mast from Google Maps

Radio masts and towers in Germany
Buildings and structures in Offenbach (district)
1962 establishments in West Germany